The Sony Ericsson W960i is a 3G phone that Sony Ericsson announced in June 2007, as an upgrade to the W950.

Features 
The W960 is a successor to the W950, and belongs to the Walkman series of phones. Its features include 8 GB of integrated flash memory, UMTS (3G) and Wi-Fi connectivity and an autofocus 3.2 megapixel camera. The phone features a touchscreen and an integrated walkman player.

Specifications

Camera
 3.2 MP (up to 2048x1536), with autofocusing and QVGA@15fps Video Recording

Networks
 GSM 900/1800/1900 + UMTS 2100, GPRS

Connectivity
 Bluetooth 2.0 + EDR    
 A2DP supported
 USB 2.0
 Wi-Fi 802.11 b(11 Mbit/s)

Storage
 8 GB, no slot

Dimensions
 109 x 55 x 16 mm

Operating System
 Symbian 9.1, UIQ 3.0

Display
 2.6 inches
 QVGA (240х320 pixels)
 262K colors
 touchscreen

Hardware
 Philips Nexperia PNX4008 ARM 9 processor at 208 MHz
 128 MB RAM
 256 MB ROM

Gallery

References

External links 

W960i
UIQ 3 Phones
Mobile phones introduced in 2007